Scalpellidae is a family of acorn barnacles in the order Scalpellomorpha. There are about 25 genera and 220 described species in Scalpellidae.

Genera
These genera belong to the family Scalpellidae:

 Abathescalpellum Newman & Ross, 1971
 Alcockianum Zevina, 1978
 Amigdoscalpellum Zevina, 1978
 Annandaleum Newman & Ross, 1971
 Arcoscalpellum Hoek, 1907
 Australscalpellum Newman & Ross, 1971
 Brochia Newman & Ross, 1971
 Catherinum Zevina, 1978
 Diotascalpellum Gale, 2015
 Graviscalpellum Foster, 1980
 Gymnoscalpellum Newman & Ross, 1971
 Hamatoscalpellum Zevina, 1978
 Litoscalpellum Newman & Ross, 1971
 Meroscalpellum Zevina, 1978
 Neoscalpellum Pilsbry, 1907
 Regioscalpellum Gale, 2015
 Scalpellopsis Broch, 1921
 Scalpellum Leach, 1818
 Weltnerium Zevina, 1978
 Zevinaella Shalaeva & Newman, 2016
 † Arcuatoscalpellum Gale, 2015
 † Collinslepas Gale, 2020
 † Jaegerscalpellum Gale, 2019
 † Virgilepas Gale, 2020
 † Virgiscalpellum Withers, 1935

References

Barnacles
Crustacean families